Romina Vidal-Russell is an Argentinean botanist who works in the areas of phytogeography, phylogeny, and parasitic plants, and on which she has written extensively. Her papers on the phylogeny of parasitic plants are cited on the APG website, and elsewhere and her collaborations are international. She currently works at the National University of Comahue in Argentina. She earned a Ph.D  at SIUC with Daniel L. Nickrent as supervisor.

(She has two botanist abbreviations in IPNI: one as a botanist, the other as a mycologist.)

Names published 
 Amyeminae Nickrent & Vidal-Russ., Taxon 59(2): 548 (2010).
 Dendrophthoinae Nickrent & Vidal-Russ., Taxon 59(2): 549 (2010).
 Emelianthinae Nickrent & Vidal-Russ., Taxon 59(2): 549 (-550) (2010).
 Ileostylinae Nickrent & Vidal-Russ., Taxon 59(2): 548 (2010).
 Ligarinae Nickrent & Vidal-Russ., Taxon 59(2): 547 (2010).

(incomplete list as Vidal-Russ.)
 Chaenothecopsis quintralis Messuti, Amico, Lorenzo & Vid.-Russ. 2012
(as Vid.-Russ. - mycology)

References

External links
 Romina Vidal-Russell, Google Scholar
 Romina Vidal-Russell, Dictionary of Argentinean Scientists
 Romina Vidal-Russell, Researchgate

Living people
21st-century Argentine botanists
Year of birth missing (living people)
Academic staff of the National University of Comahue
Argentine mycologists